vCard Extensions to WebDAV (CardDAV) is an address book client/server protocol designed to allow users to access and share contact data on a server.

CardDAV is based on WebDAV, which is based on HTTP, and it uses vCard for contact data.

History
CardDAV was proposed as an open standard for contact management in August 2011. It became known as a synchronization protocol in iOS 7, among other things, and is now also supported by Gmail, where it replaces the no longer supported (by Google) ActiveSync standard.

In October 2013, the standard received an update that made it possible to capture higher-resolution contact images and achieve lower data consumption.

Specification
The specification has been proposed as a standard by IETF as the RFC 6352 in August 2011 by C. Daboo from Apple Inc.

Implementations

Server-side
The following products implement the server-side portion of the CardDAV protocol:
Apple Contacts Server.
Baïkal it is a lightweight CalDAV and CardDAV server.
CommuniGate Pro supports CardDav protocol.
DAViCal supports CardDAV from version 0.9.9.2
fruux, a synchronization service, supporting CardDAV
GMail and Google Contacts allow access to user's address book via CardDAV.
Group-Office, an open-source groupware and CRM application
Horde Groupware, a complete web-based groupware solution with CalDAV and CardDAV support.
Mailfence Supports CardDAV protocol
MDaemon Email Server
Meishi, a standalone, Ruby on Rails based CardDAV server
Nextcloud supports CardDAV protocol since the first version.
ownCloud supports CardDAV protocol since version 2.0.
Radicale
SabreDAV, a WebDAV framework for PHP, supports CardDAV since version 1.5.
SOGo supports CardDAV access to its address books.
Zimbra 6 allows access to its address book via CardDAV.
SYNOLOGY DSM 6.0 supports CardDAV.
Xandikos is a lightweight CalDAV/CardDAV server.

Client-side
The following products implement the client-side portion of the CardDAV protocol:
Apple Contacts starting from Mac OS X Snow Leopard and higher.
Apple iOS, starting from iOS 4.
Blackberry devices running QNX - Blackberry 10+ phones, Playbook OS 2.0+ tablets
DAVx⁵ (previously called DAVdroid) is an open-source CalDAV/CardDAV sync app for Android (supporting VCard 4) 
eM Client
Evolution has built-in support for CalDAV/CardDAV. 
KDE Software Compilation 4.5 will feature CardDAV client support, due in August 2010. It will be available for use by Kaddressbook, which is part of Kontact PIM suite. It will be provided by Akonadi: a PIM server which will also make the data available to other applications.
Kerio Connect
Outlook CalDav Synchronizer
Sailfish OS, the OS of the Jolla phones and tablet (since 2015)
Thunderbird, native from version 91, or the CardBook add-on. Old versions via the SOGo Connector

See also
Comparison of CalDAV and CardDAV implementations
CalDAV
Exchange ActiveSync
GroupDAV
SyncML
vCard
WebDAV

References

External links
The Internet Engineering Task Force (IETF)
CardDAV Resources

Hypertext Transfer Protocol
Servers (computing)